The Sunlight League was founded in England in 1924 by C. W. Saleeby. Its aim was: "to point to the light of day, to advocate its use for the cure of disease—"helio-therapy"; and, immeasurably better, for preventive medicine and constructive health, the building of whole and happy bodies from the cradle and before it, which we may call helio-hygiene".

The League was closely associated with the Men's Dress Reform Party. It was also an early campaigner against air pollution from coal smoke. Although the Sunlight League did not overtly promote nudism Saleeby did confide to friends that the idea behind it was to stimulate the nudist movement.

The League was dissolved in 1940, following the death of Saleeby.  In modern times, there is concern about the risk of skin cancer from excessive exposure to sunlight. However, The Sunlight League was recalled in a 1996 article in The Independent newspaper, which argued that fear of sunlight may have gone too far.

New Zealand
Cora Wilding founded a Sunlight League in New Zealand in 1930.  It is not known whether this was connected with the League in England.

References

1924 establishments in England
1940 disestablishments in England
Health in England
Sun
Naturism in the United Kingdom